Dausa Lok Sabha constituency is one of the 25 Lok Sabha (parliamentary)  constituencies in Rajasthan state in India.

Assembly segments
Presently, Dausa Lok Sabha constituency comprises eight Vidhan Sabha (legislative assembly) segments. These are:

Members of Parliament

Election results

2019

2014

See also
 Dausa district
 List of Constituencies of the Lok Sabha

Notes

External links
Dausa lok sabha  constituency election 2019 result details

Dausa district
Lok Sabha constituencies in Rajasthan